The Yanan Formation, alternatively spelled the Yan'an Formation (simplified Chinese: 延安组) is a geological formation in China, it is also alternatively considered a group. The age of the formation is uncertain, with estimates ranging from Toarcian to Bajocian. It is divided up into 5 members, with the designation of Y1 through Y5. Y2, Y3 and Y4 are predominantly dark shales, while Y1 and Y5 are composed of sandstones, coal beds and interbedded mudstones. The depositional environment at the time was when the Ordos Basin formed a large inland lake, surrounded by floodplains. The dark shales have been explored for the potential of producing shale gas. The coal has also been explored for the production of coalbed methane. The formation is also notable for its fossil content, with dinosaur footprints having been found in the formation. The dinosaur Lingwulong was formerly thought to have been found in this formation, but the strata was later attributed to the overlying Zhiluo Formation.

References 

Geologic formations of China
Jurassic System of Asia
Lower Jurassic Series
Middle Jurassic Series
Jurassic China
Shale formations
Sandstone formations
Mudstone formations
Coal formations
Coal in China
Fluvial deposits
Lacustrine deposits
Ningxia
Paleontology in Inner Mongolia
Paleontology in Shaanxi